The People First Party is a political party in the Solomon Islands. It currently holds one seat in the National Parliament of Solomon Islands, Chachabule Rebi Amoi from Marovo constituency.

Electoral history

References 

Political parties in the Solomon Islands
Political parties established in 2014
2010s establishments in the Solomon Islands